Derakht-e Sefidar (also Romanized as Derakht-e Sefīdār; also known as Sefīd Dāl) is a village in Piveh Zhan Rural District, Ahmadabad District, Mashhad County, Razavi Khorasan Province, Iran. At the 2006 census, its population was 134, in 39 families.

References 

Populated places in Mashhad County